Moscito (Major Oriented Strong Club — Intermediate Two Openings, sometimes Major Oriented Strong Club, Intrepid Two Openings) is a bidding or bridge system of the game of contract bridge devised by the Australian expert Paul Marston and Stephen Burgess the mid-1980s.  According to Marston, this modification of his strong pass systems came about because of political repression by the American faction in the World Bridge Federation.  It has many variants.  Most variants of Moscito uses the Symmetric Relay structure developed by Prof. Roy Kerr for slam bidding.

In all variations of Moscito, 1 is used for strong hands, hence they are strong club systems like the precision club.  Usually the MAFIA (Majors First Always) principle is followed, such that a 4-card or longer major suit holding is always opened ahead of any minor suit however long or strong, but this has been slightly relaxed in later variants.  Older versions typically have a special opening bid that shows both majors, while later versions use transfer bids in the openings.

References

Bridge systems